Osun-Osogbo is a sacred grove along the banks of the Osun river just outside the city of Osogbo, Osun State of Nigeria.

The Osun-Osogbo Grove is several centuries old and is among the last of the sacred forests that once adjoined the edges of most Yoruba cities before extensive urbanization. In recognition of its global significance and its cultural value, the Sacred Grove was inscribed as a UNESCO World Heritage Site in 2005.

The 1950s witnessed the desecration of the Osun-Osogbo Grove: shrines were neglected and priests abandoned the grove as customary responsibilities and sanctions weakened. Prohibited actions like fishing, hunting and falling of trees in the Grove was done indiscriminately until an Austrian national named Susanne Wenger (1915-2009) helped to reinstate traditional protections.

With the support and encouragement of the Ataoja (the royal king of the time) and the support of the concerned local people. Wenger "formed the New Sacred Art movement to challenge land speculators, repel poachers, protect shrines and begin the long process of bringing the sacred place back to life by establishing it again, as the sacred heart of Osogbo". Wenger later came to be honored the titled "Adunni Olorisha" for her custodial efforts and her consistent devotion to the gods of the grove.
Today, the Osun River has been contaminated as a result of indiscriminate and unregulated mining activities in the nearby town of Ilesha.

Osun-Osogbo Festival
Ever since that year, the Osun-Osogbo Festival is celebrated in August at the Grove. The festival attracts thousands of Osun worshippers, spectators and tourists from all over the world.

History of the Festival 
Osun-Osogbo Festival is believed to have a history of more than 700 years. Historically, an ancestral occurrence led to the celebration of this festival. Once upon a time, a group of migrants who were led by a great hunter called Olutimehin settled on the bank of the Osun river to save themselves from famine. On the river-side, Yeye Osun the river goddess appeared from the water in front of Olutimehin and requested him to lead people to a special place (the present-day Osogbo town). The goddess promised to protect the group and bring them prosperity in return for an annual sacrifice to her. The group accepted the proposition, and today the annual sacrifice to the Osun River Goddess is still celebrated as the Osun-Osogbo Festival.

Celebrations 
In modern times, August is a month of celebration for the people of Osogbo land that includes the traditional cleansing of the city and the cultural reunion of the people with their ancestors, the founders of the Osogbo Kingdom.

The Osun-Osogbo Festival itself is a two-week-long programme. The traditional cleansing of Osogbo is called 'Iwopopo', which is followed after three days by the lighting of the 500-year-old sixteen-point lamp called 'Ina Olojumerindinlogun'(16 face lamp). Then comes the 'Iboriade', an assemblage of the crowns of the past rulers, the Ataojas of Osogbo, for blessings. 

The Festival culminates in a procession to the shrine in the sacred grove where a large crowd builds up. Drumming, dancing, musical performing, wearing of elaborate costumes, speaking of the Yoruba language, recitation of praise poetry, and so on add pomp and colour to the proceedings. This event is led by the sitting Ataoja of Osogbo along with a ritualized performer called the Arugba(calabash carrier) and a committee of priestesses, who reenact the very first meeting between Oluwatimilehin and Yeye Osun. Arugba is played by a young woman of a kingly lineage and offers the sacrifice to the deity.  

In 2020, the procession was limited to the ritual performers and public participation was suspended due to COVID-19.

Benefits of the Festival
The festival is of immense benefit to the tourism sector of Nigeria. It enables the community to sell its culture to tourists coming from both within the country and from all over the world.

The Osun-Osogbo festival also serves as a strong unifying factor in Osogbo land, as irrespective of the different social, economic, religious and political convictions of the people, they all come together annually to celebrate the goddess.

References

External links
Sacred Orisa Gardens of the West
Osun Osogbo Sacred Grove- UNESCO
Ijele: Art Ejournal of the African World
Osun Osogbo, the film
Lady from Osogbo, long feature film
Oshunfilm
Osun-Osogbo Sacred Grove

World Heritage Sites in Nigeria
Religion in Nigeria
Osogbo
Sacred groves
Sacred sites in traditional African religions
Yoruba religion
Yoruba architecture